Juan Escudero Bueno (25 September 1920 – 3 January 2012) was a Spanish professional footballer who played as a midfielder for Athletic Aviación de Madrid, winning the La Liga in 1940 and 1941.

References

1920 births
2012 deaths
Sportspeople from Salamanca
Spanish footballers
Atlético Madrid footballers
La Liga players
Association football midfielders